Sir John Pakington, 3rd Baronet, (c. 1649 – March 1688) of Westwood House near Droitwich, Worcestershire was the only surviving son of Sir John Pakington, 2nd Baronet. Like most of his family he was a Tory and served as member of parliament for Worcestershire in James II's Parliament.

He spent a quiet life at Westwood, studying under the guidance of George Hickes, dean of Worcester, under whose tuition he became one of the finest Anglo-Saxon scholars of his time.

He died in March 1688. He had married Margaret, daughter of Sir John Keyt, 1st Baronet of Ebrington, Gloucestershire.  and was succeeded by his only son, Sir John Pakington, 4th Baronet.

References

Burke's Peerage and Baronetage (1939)

1649 births
1688 deaths
Baronets in the Baronetage of England
English MPs 1685–1687
Members of the Parliament of England for Worcestershire